The following list is a discography of production by  Spellz, a Nigeria record producer from Lagos State.

Singles produced

References

Discographies of Nigerian artists
Albums produced by Spellz